Kris Monaghan (born August 24, 1960) is an American professional golfer who played on the LPGA Tour.

Monaghan won twice on the LPGA Tour, in 1990 and 1993.

Professional wins

LPGA Tour wins (2)

References

External links

American female golfers
LPGA Tour golfers
Golfers from Washington (state)
University of Oklahoma alumni
New Mexico Lobos athletes
Eastern Washington University alumni
Sportspeople from Spokane, Washington
1960 births
Living people
21st-century American women